Fairyport is a double LP by Wigwam, which was released in 1971.

Track listing

Side A
 "Losing Hold"  – 7:06
 "Lost Without a Trace"  – 2:29
 "Fairyport"  – 6:53

Side B
 "Gray Traitors"  – 2:48
 "Cafffkaff, the Country Psychologist"  – 5:22
 "May Your Will Be Done, Dear Lord"  – 5:28
 "How to Make It Big in Hospital"  – 3:03

Side C
 "Hot Mice"  – 3:18
 "P.K.'s Super Market"  – 2:19
 "One More Try"  – 3:25
 "Rockin' Ol' Galway"  – 2:28
 "Every Fold"  – 3:06

Side D
 "Rave-Up for the Roadies"   – 17:20

Bonus tracks on CD version
 "Losing Hold/Finlandia"   - 10:57

Personnel
Wigwam
 Jukka Gustavson - vocals, piano, electric piano, organ
 Jim Pembroke - vocals & harmonica; piano (A2, C5)
 Pekka Pohjola - bass guitar, violin; acoustic guitar (C3); piano (C1, C2); celesta (C2); harpsichord (C2); backing vocals (A3)
 Ronnie Österberg - drums, percussion; backing vocals (A3)

Guest musicians:
 Unto Haapa-Aho - bass clarinet
 Eero Koivistoinen - soprano saxophone
 Tapio Louhensalo - bassoon
 Risto Pensola - clarinet
 Pekka Pöyry - soprano saxophone
 Hannu Saxelin - clarinet 
 Jukka Tolonen - electric guitar (A2, B4, D)
 Ilmari Varila - oboe

External links
Album entry at Wigwam - Nuclear Netclub website
Album entry at Discogs.com

1971 albums
Wigwam (Finnish band) albums
Love Records albums